Flèche d'Emeraude is a single-day road bicycle race to be held annually from 2011 in April in a circuit around Saint-Malo, Brittany, France. The race will be organized as a 1.1 event on the UCI Europe Tour.

Winners 

UCI Europe Tour races
Recurring sporting events established in 2011
Cycle races in France
2011 establishments in France